The 2021 Oregon State Beavers football team represented Oregon State University during the 2021 NCAA Division I FBS football season. They were led by fourth-year head coach Jonathan Smith. The team played their home games on campus at Reser Stadium in Corvallis, Oregon, as a member of the North Division of the Pac-12 Conference. 

Defensive Coordinator Tim Tibesar's contract was terminated on November 7, the day after their 37–34 loss to Colorado.

Schedule

Sources:

Rankings

Game summaries

at Purdue

vs Hawaii

vs Idaho

at USC

vs Washington

at Washington State

vs Utah

at California

at Colorado

vs Stanford

vs Arizona State

at No. 11 Oregon

vs Utah State (2021 LA Bowl)

References

Oregon State
Oregon State Beavers football seasons
Oregon State Beavers football